Operation Plumbbob was a series of nuclear tests that were conducted between May 28 and October 7, 1957, at the Nevada Test Site, following Project 57, and preceding Project 58/58A.

Background

The operation consisted of 29 explosions, of which only two did not produce any nuclear yield. Twenty-one laboratories and government agencies were involved. While most Operation Plumbbob tests contributed to the development of warheads for intercontinental and intermediate range missiles, they also tested air defense and anti-submarine warheads with smaller yields. They included forty-three military effects tests on civil and military structures, radiation and bio-medical studies, and aircraft structural tests. Operation Plumbbob had the tallest tower tests to date in the U.S. nuclear testing program as well as high-altitude balloon tests. One nuclear test involved the largest troop maneuver ever associated with U.S. nuclear testing.

Approximately 18,000 members of the U.S. Air Force, Army, Navy and Marines participated in exercises Desert Rock VII and VIII during Operation Plumbbob. The military was interested in knowing how the average foot-soldier would stand up, physically and psychologically, to the rigors of the tactical nuclear battlefield.

Almost 1,200 pigs were subjected to bio-medical experiments and blast-effects studies during Operation Plumbbob. On shot Priscilla (37 kt), 719 pigs were used in various experiments on Frenchman Flat. Some pigs were placed in elevated cages and provided with suits made of different materials, to test which materials provided best protection from the thermal radiation. As shown and reported in the PBS documentary Dark Circle, the pigs survived, but with third-degree burns to 80% of their bodies. Other pigs were placed in pens behind large sheets of glass at measured distances from the hypocenter to test the effects of flying debris on living targets.
Studies were conducted of radioactive contamination and fallout from a simulated accidental detonation of a weapon; and projects concerning earth motion, blast loading and neutron output were carried out.

Nuclear weapons safety experiments were conducted to study the possibility of a nuclear weapon detonation during an accident. On July 26, 1957, a safety experiment, Pascal-A, was detonated in an unstemmed hole at the Nevada Test Site, becoming the first underground shaft nuclear test. The knowledge gained here would provide data to prevent nuclear yields in case of accidental detonations—for example, in a plane crash.

The John shot on July 19, 1957, was the only test of the Air Force's AIR-2 Genie missile with a nuclear warhead. It was fired from an F-89J Scorpion fighter over Yucca Flats at the Nevada National Security Site. On the ground, the Air Force carried out a public relations event by having five Air Force officers and a videographer stand under ground zero of the blast, which took place at between  altitude, with the idea of demonstrating the possibility of the use of the weapon over civilian populations without ill effects. The five officers were: Colonel Sidney C. Bruce, later professor of Electrical Engineering at Colorado University, died in 2005; Lieutenant Colonel Frank P. Ball, died in 2003; Major John w. Hughes II, died in 1990; Major Norman B. Bodinger, died February 2, 1997; Major Donald A. Luttrell, died December 20, 2014. The videographer, Akira "George" Yoshitake, died in October 2013.

The Rainier shot, conducted September 19, 1957, was the first fully contained underground nuclear test, meaning that no fission products were vented into the atmosphere. This test of 1.7 kt could be detected around the world by seismologists using ordinary seismic instruments. The Rainier test became the prototype for larger and more powerful underground tests.

Images from Upshot-Knothole Grable were accidentally relabeled as belonging to the Priscilla shot from Operation Plumbbob in 1957. As a consequence publications including official government documents have the photo mislabeled. The shots can be told apart by the trails of test rockets, which are prominently featured in images and footage of Grable, but appear almost completely absent at the actual Priscilla shot.

Missing steel bore cap

 In 1956, Dr Robert Brownlee, from Los Alamos National Laboratory in New Mexico, was asked to examine whether nuclear detonations could be conducted underground. The first subterranean test was the nuclear device known as Pascal A, which was lowered down a   borehole. However, the detonated yield turned out to be 50,000 times greater than anticipated, creating a jet of fire that shot hundreds of feet into the sky. During the Pascal-B nuclear test, of August 1957, a  steel plate cap (a piece of armor plate) was welded over the borehole to contain the nuclear blast even though Brownlee predicted it would not work. The plate was never found. Scientists believe compression heating caused the cap to vaporize as it sped through the atmosphere. A high-speed camera, which took one frame per millisecond, was focused on the borehole because studying the velocity of the plate was deemed scientifically interesting. After the detonation, the plate appeared in only one frame, but this was enough to make an estimation of its speed. Dr. Brownlee joked the best estimate of the cover's speed from the photographic evidence was it was "going like a bat!". Brownlee estimated that the explosion, combined with the specific design of the shaft, could accelerate the plate to approximately six times Earth's escape velocity. In 2015 Dr. Brownlee said, "I have no idea what happened to the cap, but I always assumed that it was probably vaporized before it went into space." Later calculations made during 2019 (although the result cannot be confirmed) are strongly in favor of vaporization.

List of tests

See also

Lists of nuclear disasters and radioactive incidents
Totskoye nuclear exercise

Notes

References

External links

 Video clips: Historic color footage of shot "Owens",  during Operation Plumbbob
 Plumbbob page on the Nuclear Weapons Archive (also refers to manhole cover issue mentioned above).

Explosions in 1957
Plumbbob
Radiation health effects research
1957 in military history
1957 in Nevada
1957 in the environment